Bob Darroch (born 1940) is an illustrator, author and cartoonist from New Zealand. He writes and illustrates the popular Little Kiwi series of children's books (first published 2001), for which he received the Storylines Gaelyn Gordon Award in 2015. Darroch's cartoons have appeared in a number of newspapers, including the Whangarei Report, Hutt News, Napier Daily Telegraph, Christchurch Star and Timaru Herald.

References

External links 
Search for material by Bob Darroch on DigitalNZ.

1940 births
Living people
New Zealand cartoonists
New Zealand children's writers